The Vikings are Denmark's national Australian rules football team.
The team formed in 1992 to play the North London Lions from the British Australian Rules Football League in Denmark.

The Vikings represent the best Danish born players selected from the clubs of the Danish Australian Football League.

The Vikings wear the national colours of red and white, with the top half of Australian rules football in the shape of a horned "Viking" helmet.

Proper internationals began in 1994 when Denmark played an international in England.

In 1995, the DAFL took a decision to exclude Australians from its national team.

Since then, the Vikings have participated in the inaugural 2002 Australian Football International Cup held in Melbourne (finishing 4th).

The national team was one of two teams (the other being Nauru) that withdrew from the 2005 tournament due to an inability of the Danish league to finance the trip.

International competition

International Cup
2002: 4th
2005: Did not enter
2008: 11th
2011: 8th
2014: Did not enter
2017: Did not enter

European championships
2010: 2nd
2013: 3rd
2016: Did not enter
2019: 2nd

2008 International Cup Squad
Coach: Jim Campion (Farum Cats)
Chris Campion (Farum)
Christian Møller Larsen (Aalborg)
Christian Rose (Farum)
Christoffer Holm Nielsen (Farum)
Erik Krolmark (North Copenhagen)
Frederik Schmidt (Farum)
Frederik Schulin (Århus)
Jakob Ibsen (North Copenhagen)
Eliud K Schmidt (North Copenhagen)
Jens Djernes (Århus)
Jesper Gjørup (North Copenhagen)
Joakim Secher (Farum)
Jonas Holstein (North Copenhagen)
Kasper Sallander Holm (North Copenhagen)
Kristian Stetter (Aalborg)
Mads Buhl (Farum)
Mikkel Højgaard (Farum)
Morten Engsbye (Farum)
Nicolai Secher (Farum)
Niels Schønnemann (North Copenhagen)
Pàll Finnsson (Århus)
Peter Bjarnum (Farum)
Rasmus Jacobsen (Farum)
Rene Damborg (Aalborg)
Thore Lauritzen (Farum)
Troels Ottesen (Farum)

References

External links
DAFL Vikings

National Australian rules football teams
Australian rules football in Denmark
Australian rules football
1992 establishments in Denmark